Marcia Carolyn Kaptur (born June 17, 1946) is an American politician serving as the U.S. representative from . Now in her 21st term, she has been a member of Congress since 1983. 

A member of the Democratic Party, Kaptur is the longest-serving woman in Congressional history (having surpassed Barbara Mikulski in 2023) and the dean of Ohio's Congressional delegation.

Early life and education
Kaptur was born on June 17, 1946, in Toledo, Ohio, the daughter of Anastasia Delores (Rogowski) and Stephen Jacob Kaptur. Her parents were both of Polish descent. Her mother was an automobile union organizer and her family operated a small grocery. Kaptur started volunteering with the Ohio Democratic Party when she was 13.

Kaptur graduated from St. Ursula Academy in 1964 and became the first person in her family to attend college. She received her undergraduate degree from the University of Wisconsin–Madison in 1968 and a Master of Urban Planning from the University of Michigan in 1974. She did doctoral studies in urban planning development finance at the Massachusetts Institute of Technology in 1981.

Early career
Kaptur served on the Toledo-Lucas County Plan Commissions from 1969 to 1975. She was director of planning for the National Center for Urban Ethnic Affairs (1975–1977), founded by Geno Baroni. She later served as a domestic policy advisor during President Jimmy Carter's administration.

U.S. House of Representatives

Elections

While at MIT, Kaptur was recruited to run for Congress in 1982 against freshman Republican Ed Weber, who had upset 26-year incumbent Lud Ashley two years earlier. Despite being outspent by almost 3–1, she defeated Weber 58–39%.

In 1984, Kaptur faced a strong challenge from Republican Frank Venner, longtime anchorman and weatherman at WTVG, but defeated him 55–44%, even as Ronald Reagan carried the district. From 1986 to 2002, she won every election with at least 74% of the vote. In 2004, she faced her strongest challenger in 20 years in Lucas County auditor Larry Kaczala, but won the election 68–32%.

2006

Kaptur won her 13th term with 74% of the vote.

2008

Kaptur won her 14th term with 74% of the vote.

2010

Shortly after achieving fame during the 2008 election, conservative figure Samuel "Joe the Plumber" Wurzelbacher announced that he was considering challenging Kaptur in the 2010 election,
but chose not to run. Kaptur was instead challenged by Republican Rich Iott, a Tea Party movement favorite. She was reelected to a 15th term with 59% of the vote, her closest victory since 1984.

2012

For her first three decades in Congress, Kaptur represented a compact district centered around Toledo. Redistricting after the 2010 census extended the 9th district to western Cleveland. The new map put the home of incumbent 10th district congressman Dennis Kucinich into the 9th, so they ran against each other in the Democratic primary. Graham Veysey, a small-business owner from Cleveland, also ran in the primary. Retaining over 60% of her former territory, Kaptur won the primary with 56% of the vote to Kucinich's 40%. In the general election, she won a 16th term against Wurzelbacher and Libertarian Sean Stipe. The reconfigured 9th was no less Democratic than its predecessor, and Kaptur had effectively clinched reelection by defeating Kucinich in the primary.

2014
Kaptur's 2014 opponent was Richard May, a longtime Republican activist from west Cleveland, who beat Lakewood resident Robert C. Horrocks Jr. in the May 6 primary. Kaptur won 68–32%.

2016
Kaptur's 2016 opponent was Donald Larson, who defeated Steven Kraus and Joel Lieske in the Republican primary on March 15. Kaptur won 68–31%.

2020
Kaptur's 2020 opponent was Rob Weber, who defeated Charles W. Barrett, Tim Connors, and Timothy P. Corrigan in the Republican primary on March 17. Kaptur won 63–37%.
2022
Kaptur was seemingly placed in a vulnerable position when redistricting shifted her district to the west in order to take in territory previously in the neighboring heavily Republican . While Joe Biden carried the old 9th with 59% of the vote, the new 9th would have voted for Donald Trump with 51% of the vote. Despite this, Kaptur defeated Republican nominee J.R. Majewski, 56% to 43%.

Tenure
In 1996, Ross Perot asked Kaptur to be his vice-presidential running mate. She declined.

As of March 2022, Kaptur had voted in line with Joe Biden's stated position 100% of the time.

Patent reform 
Kaptur opposed the America Invents Act that passed into law and changed the U.S. Patent System. She opposed changing from a "first to invent system" to a "first to file system", saying it hurt small businesses and "Our patent system is the finest in the world... the proposed solutions are special fixes that benefit these few giants at the expense of everyone else."

Kaptur co-sponsored the Restoring America's Leadership in Innovation Act. In order to strengthen inventors' property rights, the bill would remove the administrative review process that allows the public to challenge patent filings' validity; the process exists to prevent misuse of the patent system.

World War II memorial 

On December 10, 1987, Kaptur introduced the World War II Memorial Act in the House. The bill authorized the American Battle Monuments Commission to establish a World War II memorial. It was not voted on before the end of the session and so failed to be enacted. Kaptur introduced similar legislation twice in 1989 but these bills also failed to become law.

Kaptur introduced legislation for the fourth time on January 27, 1993. This time the legislation was voted on and passed in the House on May 10, 1993. After a companion bill was passed in the United States Senate, President Bill Clinton signed the bill into law on May 25, 1993.

Kaptur later said that she felt "a great sense of fulfillment" that the memorial was built. "This generation was the most unselfish America has ever seen," she said. "They never asked anybody for anything in return."

Abortion 
Kaptur holds a 95% rating from NARAL. She supported Roe v. Wade, calling it "the law of the land". She has voted for some proposals to restrict access to abortion and opposed others. In January 2007, she was the only member of the Congressional Progressive Caucus to vote against federally funded embryonic stem-cell research. Kaptur voted for the Stupak-Pitts Amendment, an amendment to America's Affordable Health Choices Act of 2009. She was one of only 16 Democrats to vote for the No Taxpayer Funding for Abortion Act on May 4, 2011. Kaptur also voted to ban partial-birth abortions in 2000 and 2003. She voted against the Child Custody Protection Act in 1999 and the Child Interstate Abortion Notification Act in 2005. Kaptur voted against allowing privately funded abortions at overseas military hospitals twice in 1995, as well as in 1997, 1998 and 1999. In 2005, Kaptur voted to lift the ban on abortions at overseas military hospitals.

In 2023, Kaptur voted against the Born-Alive Abortion Survivors Protection Act, which would have criminalized failing to provide care for an infant born alive after an abortion attempt.

Free trade 
Kaptur opposes free trade agreements. She helped lead opposition to the North American Free Trade Agreement, permanent normal trade relations for the People's Republic of China, and fast track authority for the president.

2008 economic crisis 
Kaptur opposed the Emergency Economic Stabilization Act of 2008, which provided a bailout for U.S. banks. Her opposition to the bailout was highlighted in Michael Moore's 2009 documentary Capitalism: A Love Story.

On April 12, 2011, Kaptur introduced H.R. 1489 to restore the Glass–Steagall Act, "To repeal certain provisions of the Gramm–Leach–Bliley Act and revive the separation between commercial banking and the securities business, in the manner provided in the Banking Act of 1933, the so-called 'Glass–Steagall Act', and for other purposes." There were 30 co-sponsors.

The environment 

Kaptur backed the American Clean Energy and Security Act in the U.S. House after she was able to insert an amendment that would authorize the Secretary of Energy to create power marketing authorities in regions where none exist. One such area would be the Great Lakes region. Kaptur said the St. Lawrence Seaway Development Corporation could administer up to $3.5 billion in borrowing authority to stimulate economic development through creation of green energy such as solar power and wind power. She said the $3.5 billion in borrowing authority would promote "regional equity" and serve as a powerful engine for job creation in a region that has suffered from high energy costs, especially expensive electricity.

Immigration reform 
Kaptur was one of 38 Democrats to vote against the DREAM Act in December 2010. It passed the House but failed in the Senate.

In 2021, Kaptur voted for the DREAM Act.

2016 presidential election 
Kaptur endorsed Senator Bernie Sanders in the Democratic primary, and introduced him at a rally in Toledo. On October 3, 2016, she endorsed the nominee, Hillary Clinton, who had won Ohio and her district in the primary, at a rally in Toledo.

Gun control 
In 2022, Kaptur voted for H.R. 1808: Assault Weapons Ban of 2022. The legislation would ban semiautomatic rifles, including AR-15s, the most popular rifles in the U.S.

Syria 
In 2023, Kaptur voted against H.Con.Res. 21, which directed President Joe Biden to remove U.S. troops from Syria within 180 days.

Ukraine 
Kaptur co-chairs the Ukrainian Caucus. She has been a vocal supporter of Ukrainian President Volodymyr Zelenskyy. Kaptur has said Ukraine "voted for her own independence and has been laboring to be free with continued Russian meddling in her country all these decades." In February 2023, Kaptur signed a letter advocating for President Biden to give F-16 fighter jets to Ukraine.

Committee assignments
 Committee on Appropriations
 Subcommittee on Energy and Water Development (Ranking member)
 Subcommittee on Defense

Caucus memberships
 Congressional Arts Caucus
 Congressional Ukrainian Caucus (co-chair)
 Congressional Caucus on Poland
 Congressional Caucus on Central and Eastern Europe
 Congressional Caucus on Hungary
 Congressional United Kingdom Caucus
 House Baltic Caucus
Climate Solutions Caucus
Blue Collar Caucus

Electoral history

|+ : Results 1982–2022
! Year
!
! Democratic
! Votes
! %
!
! Republican
! Votes
! %
!
! Third Party
! Party
! Votes
! %
!
! Third Party
! Party
! Votes
! %
!
! Third Party
! Party
! Votes
! %
!
|-
|1982
||
| |Marcy Kaptur
| |95,162
| |58%
|
| |Ed Weber
| |64,459
| |39%
|
| |Susan Skinner
| |Independent
| |1,785
| |1%
|
| |James Somers
| |Independent
| |1,594
| |1%
|
| |Brian Muir
| |Libertarian
| |1,217
| |1%
|
|-
|1984
||
| |Marcy Kaptur
| |117,985
| |55%
|
| |Frank Venner
| |93,210
| |43%
|
| |Other
| |
| |3,714
| |2%
|*
|
|
|
|
|
|
|
|
|
|
|-
|1986
||
| |Marcy Kaptur
| |105,646
| |78%
|
| |Mike Shufeldt
| |30,643
| |22%
|
|
|
|
|
|
|
|
|
|
|
|
|
|
|
|
|-
|1988
||
| |Marcy Kaptur
| |157,557
| |81%
|
| |Al Hawkins
| |36,183
| |19%
|*
|
|
|
|
|
|
|
|
|
|
|
|
|
|
|
|-
|1990
||
| |Marcy Kaptur
| |117,681
| |78%
|
| |Jerry Lammers
| |33,791
| |22%
|
|
|
|
|
|
|
|
|
|
|
|
|
|
|
|
|-
|1992
||
| |Marcy Kaptur
| |178,879
| |74%
|
| |Ken Brown
| |53,011
| |22%
|
| |Edward Howard
| |Independent
| |11,162
| |5%
|*
|
|
|
|
|
|
|
|
|
|
|-
|1994
||
| |Marcy Kaptur
| |118,120
| |75%
|
| |Randy Whitman
| |38,665
| |25%
|
|
|
|
|
|
|
|
|
|
|
|
|
|
|
|
|-
|1996
||
| |Marcy Kaptur
| |170,617
| |77%
|
| |Randy Whitman
| |46,040
| |21%
|
|! style="background:#00bfff; "|Elizabeth Slotnick
|! style="background:#00bfff; "|Natural Law
|! style="background:#00bfff; "|4,677
|! style="background:#00bfff; "|2%
|
|
|
|
|
|
|
|
|
|
|
|-
|1998
||
| |Marcy Kaptur
| |130,793
| |81%
|
| |Ed Emery
| |30,312
| |19%
|
|
|
|
|
|
|
|
|
|
|
|
|
|
|
|
|-
|2000
||
| |Marcy Kaptur
| |168,547
| |75%
|
| |Dwight Bryan
| |49,446
| |22%
|
| |Galen Fries
| |Libertarian
| |4,239
| |2%
|
|! style="background:#00bfff; "|Dennis Slotnick
|! style="background:#00bfff; "|Natural Law
|! style="background:#00bfff; "|3,096
|! style="background:#00bfff; "|1%
|
|
|
|
|
|
|-
|2002
||
| |Marcy Kaptur
| |132,236
| |74%
|
| |Ed Emery
| |46,481
| |26%
|
|
|
|
|
|
|
|
|
|
|
|
|
|
|
|
|-
|2004
||
| |Marcy Kaptur
| |205,149
| |68%
|
| |Larry Kaczala
| |95,983
| |32%
|
|
|
|
|
|
|
|
|
|
|
|
|
|
|
|
|-
|2006
||
| |Marcy Kaptur
| |153,880
| |74%
|
| |Bradley Leavitt
| |55,119
| |26%
|
|
|
|
|
|
|
|
|
|
|
|
|
|
|
|
|-
|2008
||
| |Marcy Kaptur
| |222,054
| |74%
|
| |Bradley Leavitt
| |76,512
| |26%
|
|
|
|
|
|
|
|
|
|
|
|
|
|
|
|
|-
|2010
||
| |Marcy Kaptur
| |121,819
| |59%
|
| |Rich Iott
| |83,423
| |41%
|
|
|
|
|
|
|
|
|
|
|
|
|
|
|
|
|-
|2012
||
| |Marcy Kaptur
| |217,771
| |73%
|
| |Samuel J. Wurzelbacher
| |68,668
| |23%
|
| |Sean Stipe
| |Libertarian
| |11,725
| |4%
|
|
|
|
|
|
|
|
|
|
|
|-
|2014
||
| |Marcy Kaptur
| |108,870
| |68%
|
| |Richard May
| |51,704
| |32%
|*
|
|
|
|
|
|
|
|
|
|
|
|
|
|
|
|-
|2016
||
| |Marcy Kaptur
| |193,966
| |69%
|
| |Donald Philip Larson
| |88,427
| |31%
|*
|
|
|
|
|
|
|
|
|
|
|
|
|
|
|
|-
|2018
||
| |Marcy Kaptur
| |152,682	
| |68%
|
| |Steve Kraus
| |73,183
| |32%
|*
|
|
|
|
|
|
|
|
|
|
|
|
|
|
|
|-
|2020
||
| |Marcy Kaptur
| |190,328	
| |63%
|
| |Rob Weber
| |111,385
| |37%
|
|
|
|
|
|
|
|
|
|
|
|
|
|
|
|
|-
|2022
||
| |Marcy Kaptur
| |150,655
| |56%
|
| |J.R. Majewski
| |115,362	
| |43%
|
|
|
|
|
|
|
|
|
|
|
|
|
|
|
|

*In 1984, all 3,714 votes for other candidates are considered write-in ballots. In 1988, 72 write-in ballots were cast. In 1992, 50 write-in ballots were cast. In 2014, write-in candidates Cory Hoffman and George A. Skalsky received 112 votes and 29 votes, respectively. In 2016, write-in candidate George A. Skalsky received 5 votes.

Personal life
Kaptur is Catholic.

See also

 Ohio's 9th congressional district
 List of United States representatives from Ohio
 National World War II Memorial
 Women in the United States House of Representatives

References

External links

 Congresswoman Marcy Kaptur official U.S. House website
 Marcy Kaptur for Congress
 

 

|-

1946 births
21st-century American politicians
21st-century American women politicians
American politicians of Polish descent
American Roman Catholics
Female members of the United States House of Representatives
Living people
Left-wing populism in the United States
Massachusetts Institute of Technology alumni
Politicians from Toledo, Ohio
Taubman College of Architecture and Urban Planning alumni
University of Wisconsin–Madison alumni
Women in Ohio politics
Democratic Party members of the United States House of Representatives from Ohio
Catholics from Ohio
20th-century Roman Catholics
21st-century Roman Catholics